The Courland Pocket was an area of the Courland Peninsula where Army Group North of Nazi Germany and the Reichskommissariat Ostland were cut off and surrounded by the Red Army for almost a year, lasting from July 1944 until 10 May 1945.

The pocket was created during the Red Army's Baltic Offensive, when forces of the 1st Baltic Front reached the Baltic Sea near Memel (Klaipėda) during its lesser Memel Offensive Operation phases. This action isolated the German Army Group North from the rest of the German forces, having been pushed from the south by the Red Army, standing in a front between Tukums and Libau in Latvia, with the Baltic Sea in the West, the Irbe Strait in the North and the Gulf of Riga in the East behind the Germans. Renamed Army Group Courland on 25 January, the Army Group in the Courland Pocket remained isolated until the end of the war. When they were ordered to surrender to the Soviet command on 8 May, they were in "blackout" and did not get the official order before 10 May, two days after the capitulation of Germany. It was one of the last German groups to surrender in Europe.

Background

Courland, then part of the Latvian SSR, along with the rest of the Baltic eastern coast and islands, was overrun by Army Group North during 1941. Army Group North spent most of the next two years attempting to take Leningrad, without success. In January 1944, the Soviet Army lifted the siege of Leningrad.

On 22 June 1944, the Red Army launched the Belorussian Strategic Offensive, codenamed Operation Bagration. The goal of this offensive was to recapture the Belorussian SSR from the German occupation. Operation Bagration was extremely successful, resulting in the almost complete destruction of Army Group Centre, and ended on 29 August. In its final stages (the Kaunas and Šiauliai Offensives), Operation Bagration saw Soviet forces strike deep towards the Baltic coast, severing communications between the German Army Group North and the remnants of Army Group Centre.

After Operation Bagration ended, the Soviet forces continued the clearing of the Baltic coast, despite German attempts to restore the front in Operation Doppelkopf. The Red Army fought the Memel Offensive Operation with the goal of isolating Army Group North by capturing the city of Memel (Klaipėda).

Battles of the Courland Bridgehead

On 9 October 1944, the Soviet forces reached the Baltic Sea near Memel after over-running the headquarters of the 3rd Panzer Army. As a result, Army Group North was cut off from East Prussia. Hitler's military advisors—notably Heinz Guderian, the Chief of the German General Staff—urged evacuation and utilisation of the troops to stabilise the front in central Europe. However, Hitler refused, and ordered the German forces in Courland and the Estonian islands Hiiumaa (Dagö) and Saaremaa (Ösel) to hold out, believing them necessary to protect German submarine bases along the Baltic coast. Hitler still believed the war could be won, and hoped that Dönitz's new Type XXI U-boat technology could bring victory to Germany in the Battle of the Atlantic, forcing the Allies out of Western Europe. This would allow German forces to focus on the Eastern Front, using the Courland Pocket as a springboard for a new offensive.

Hitler's refusal to evacuate the Army Group resulted in the entrenchment of more than 200,000 German troops largely of the 16th Army and 18th Army, in what was to become known to the Germans as the "Courland Bridgehead". Thirty-three divisions of the Army Group North, commanded by Field-Marshall Ferdinand Schörner, were cut off from East Prussia and spread out along a front reaching from Riga to Liepāja, retreating to the more defensible Courland position, abandoning Riga.

Soviet forces launched six major offensives against the German and Latvian forces entrenched in the Courland Pocket between 15 October 1944 and 4 April 1945. The German two-phase withdrawals during the execution of the second stage of the Soviet Baltic Offensive (14 September – 24 November 1944), subsequent to the pocket being formed in the Baltic Offensive's first stage, the Memel Offensive Operation.

Timeline
From 15 to 22 October 1944 – Soviets launched the Riga Offensive Operation on the 15th at 10:00 after conducting a heavy artillery barrage. Hitler permitted the Army Group Commander, Ferdinand Schoerner, to commence withdrawal from Riga on 11 October, and the city was taken by the 3rd Baltic Front on 13 October. The front stabilised with the main remnant of Army Group North isolated in the peninsula.

From 27 October to 25 November – Soviets launched an offensive trying to break through the front toward Skrunda and Saldus including at one point initiating a simultaneous attack by 52 divisions. Soviet forces also attacked southeast of Liepāja in an attempt to capture that port. 80 divisions assaulted the Germans from 1 to 15 November in a front 12 km wide. The Soviet breakthrough stalled after roughly 4 kilometers.

The third phase of the fighting (also known as "the other Christmas Battle") started on 21 December with a Soviet attack on Germans near Saldus. The Soviet 2nd Baltic (northern sector) and 1st Baltic Fronts (southern sector) commenced a blockade, precipitating the German defence of the Courland perimeter during Soviet attempts to reduce it. In this battle, serving with the 2nd Baltic Front's 22nd Army, the Latvian 130th Rifle Corps faced their opposites in the Latvian 19th SS Division. The battle ended on 31 December and the front was stabilized.

On 15 January 1945, Army Group North was renamed Army Group Courland under Colonel-General Lothar Rendulic. In the middle of January Heinz Guderian got Hitler's permission to withdraw 7 divisions from Courland, however, Hitler refused to consider a total withdrawal. The 4th Panzer Division, 31st, 32nd, 93rd Infantry Divisions, 11th SS Division Nordland and the remnants of the battered 227th, 218th and 389th Infantry Divisions and 15th Latvian SS-Division were evacuated over the sea. On 23 January Soviet forces launched an offensive trying to break through the front toward Liepāja and Saldus. They managed to take the bridgeheads on Bārta and Vārtāja rivers but were once again driven off by the Germans.

The fifth battle started on 12 February with a Soviet attack against the Germans towards . Other attacks took place south of Liepāja where the Soviets massed 21 divisions, and south of Tukums where 11 divisions tried to break through the German front and take the town. On 16 February the Soviets started an offensive against the 19th Division.

Surrender
On 8 May, Germany's Head of State and President Karl Dönitz ordered Colonel-General Carl Hilpert – the Army Group's last commander – to surrender. Hilpert, his personal staff, and staffs of three Armies surrendered to Marshal Leonid Govorov, the commander of the Leningrad Front. At this time, the group still consisted of the remnants of 27 divisions and one brigade.

On 8 May, General Otto Friedrich Rauser succeeded in obtaining better surrender terms from the Soviet command. On 9 May, the Soviet commission in Peilei started to interrogate the captive staff of Army Group Courland, and general collection of prisoners began.

By 12 May, approximately 135,000 German troops surrendered in the Courland Pocket. On 23 May, the Soviet collection of the German troops in the Courland Pocket was completed. A total of about 180,000 German troops were taken into captivity from the Baltic area. The bulk of the prisoners of war were initially held at the Valdai Hills camps.

German Order of Battle (March 1945) 

See also Army Group Courland
Army Group North (to 25 January 1945)
Army Group Courland (25 January 1945 to 8 May 1945)
Generaloberst Heinrich von Vietinghoff – from 10 March 1945	Generaloberst Lothar Rendulic – from 25 March 1945 Generaloberst Carl Hilpert

German 16th Army 
General der Infanterie Carl Hilpert – from 10 March 1945 General der Infanterie Ernst-Anton von Krosigk (KIA) – from 16 March General der Gebirgstruppen Friedrich-Jobst Volckamer von Kirchensittenbach

 XVI. Armeekorps – Generalleutnant Ernst-Anton von Krosigk – from 10 March Generalleutnant Gottfried Weber
 81. Infanterie-Division – Generalleutnant Franz Eccard von Bentivegni
 300. Infanterie-Division z. b. V. – Generalmajor Anton Eberth
 21. Luftwaffen-Feld-Division – Generalleutnant Albert Henze, 16 February 1945 Generalmajor Otto Barth
 VI. SS-Armeekorps – SS-Obergruppenführer Walter Krüger
 24. Infanterie-Division – Generalmajor Harald Schultz
 12. Panzer-Division – Generalleutnant Erpo von Bodenhausen, from 14 April 1945 Generalmajor Horst von Usedom
 19. SS-Grenadier-Division – SS-Gruppenführer und Generalleutnant der Waffen-SS Bruno Streckenbach
 XXXVIII. Armeekorps – General der Artillerie Kurt Herzog
122. Infanterie-Division – General der Infanterie Friedrich Fangohr, from 20 January 1945 Generalmajor Bruno Schatz
 290. Infanterie-Division – Generalmajor Hans-Joachim Baurmeister, from 25 April 1945 Generalmajor Carl Henke, from 27 April 1945 Generalleutnant Bruno Ortler
 329. Infanterie-Division – Generalleutnant Konrad Menkel, from 1 January 1945 Generalmajor Werner Schulze

German 18th Army 
General der Infanterie Ehrenfried Boege

I. Armeekorps – General der Infanterie Friedrich Fangohr, from 21 April 1945 Generalleutnant Christian Usinger
 218. Infanterie-Division – Generalleutnant Viktor Lang, from 25 December 1944 Generalmajor Ingo von Collani, from 1 May 1945 Generalleutnant Werner Ranck
 132. Infanterie-Division – Generalleutnant Herbert Wagner, from 8 January 1945 Generalmajor Rudolf Demme
 II. Armeekorps – General der Infanterie Johannes Mayer, from 1 April 1945 Generalleutnant Alfred Gause
 263. Infanterie-Division – Generalleutnant Alfred Hemmann
 563. Volksgrenadier-Division – Generalmajor Ferdinand Brühl, from 25 February 1945 Generalmajor Werner Neumann
 X. Armeekorps – General der Artillerie Siegfried Thomaschki
87. Infanterie-Division – Generalmajor Helmuth Walter, from 16 January 1945 Generalleutnant Mauritz Freiherr von Strachwitz
 126. Infanterie-Division – Generalmajor/Generalleutnant Gotthard Fischer, from 5 January 1945 Oberst/Generalmajor Kurt Hähling
 30. Infanterie-Division – Generalmajor Otto Barth, from 30 January 1945 Generalleutnant Albert Henze
 L. Armeekorps – General der Gebirgstruppe Friedrich Jobst Volckamer von Kirchensittenbach, from 11 April 1945 Generalleutnant Erpo von Bodenhausen
 205. Infanterie-Division – Generalmajor Ernst Biehler, from 15 November 1944 Generalmajor Karl-Hans Giese
 225. Infanterie-Division – Generalleutnant Walter Risse
 11. Infanterie-Division – Generalleutnant Hellmuth Reymann, from 18 November 1944 Generalleutnant Gerhard Feyerabend
 14. Panzer-Division – Generalmajor Oskar Munzel, from 25 November 1944 Generalmajor Martin Unrein, from 19 February 1945 Oberst Friedrich-Wilhelm Jürgen, from 22 March 1945 Oberst Paul Lüneburg, from 25 March 1945 Oberst Karl-Max Gräßel

Security Divisions
 52nd Security Division : Festung Libau – Generalleutnant Albrecht Digeon von Monteton
 201st Security Division – Generalmajor Anton Eberth
 207th Security Division – only Staff

Luftwaffe
 Jagdgeschwader 54 – Oberst Dietrich Hrabak

Marine
 9. Marine-Sicherungsdivision
 1. Minensuchflottille
 3. Minensuchflottille
 25. Minensuchflottille
 31. Minensuchflottille
 1. Räumbootsflottille – Kapitänleutnant Carl Hoff
 17. Räumbootsflottille
 3. Vorpostenflottille
 9. Vorpostenflottille
 17. Vorpostenflottille
 3. Sicherungsflottille
 14. Sicherungsflottille
 13. Landungsflottille
 21. Landungsflottille
 24. Landungsflottille
 3. U-Jagdflottille
 11. U-Jagdflottille
 1. Schnellboot-Schulflottille
 2. Schnellboot-Schulflottille
 3. Schnellboot-Schulflottille

Soviet Order of Battle

1st Baltic Front (Army General Ivan Bagramyan) 
 51st Army (Army General Yakov Kreizer)
 6th Guards Army (Colonel General Ivan Chistyakov)
 4th Shock Army (Army General  Pyotr Malyshev)
 42nd Army (Lieutenant General Vladimir Petrovich Sviridov)
 1st Shock Army (Lieutenant General Vladimir N. Razuvaev)
 10th Guards Army (Lieutenant General Mikhail Kazakov)

Historiography

Soviet and Russian accounts
The First Courland Battle was intended to destroy German forces. After that failure, official accounts ignore Courland, stating only that the Soviet goal was to prevent the Germans from escaping.

In this account, the Soviet actions in Courland were defensive blocking operations. Hostilities consisted of containing German breakout attempts, and the Red Army made no concerted effort to capture the Courland Pocket, which was of little strategic importance after the isolation of Army Group North, whereas the main offensive effort was required for the Vistula-Oder and Berlin Offensives. Soviet forces suffered correspondingly low casualties. The modern research of Grigoriy Krivosheev indicates a total of 160,948 Soviet casualties between 16 February and 8 May 1945": 30,501 "irrecoverable" and 130,447 "medical" losses.

According to the Russian historian Aleksei Isaev, Courland was a peripheral front for both the Soviets and Germans. The Soviet goal was to prevent the German troops there from being transported by sea to reinforce the defense of Berlin. Soviet operations intended to further isolate and also destroy the enemy, but the strength of the attacking troops was too low to make any significant progress in the difficult terrain. The Soviet commanders worked competently and as a result the reported casualties were low.

Western sources
Stalin had initially been intent on destroying the German forces in Courland, reporting in September 1944 that he was "mopping up" in the Baltics, and in November, that the Germans were "now being hammered to a finish." As late as March 1945, Stalin was still making claims that German forces in Courland would soon be defeated. This victory was necessary, in Stalin's eyes, to re-establish Soviet control over its 1941 frontiers following the annexation of the Baltic states.

The Soviets launched six offensives to defeat the German Army Group Courland. Throughout the campaign against the Courland pocket, Soviet forces did not advance more than 25 miles anywhere along the front, ending no more than a few kilometers forward of their original positions after seven months of conflict. The Soviet operations were hampered by the difficult terrain and bad weather.

The German army group reported inflicting heavy losses on the Soviets. However, in the absence of heavy weaponry and a near total lack of air support, total German casualties in Courland were heavy as well, and estimated to be over 150,000.

The withdrawal of Soviet units starting from December 1944 indicates that the Soviet command did not consider Courland to be as important as other sectors of the Eastern Front. Destroying the German forces there was not worth the effort and the goal was now to keep them from breaking out. The next three offensives were most likely intended to prevent the evacuation of German troops by sea. By the start of April 1945, the Soviets viewed the German forces in Courland as not much more than self-supporting prisoners.

Aftermath
On 9 May 1945, General Ivan Bagramyan accepted the surrender of German forces at Ezere Manor in southwest Latvia. According to Russian records, 146,000 German and Latvian troops were taken prisoner, including 28 generals and 5,083 officers, and taken to camps in the USSR interior and imprisoned for years. Current scholarship puts the count of those surrendering at about 190,000: 189,112 Germans including 42 generals—among them the German commander, Carl Hilpert, who died in Soviet captivity in 1947—and approximately 14,000 Latvians.

The Soviets detained all males between the ages of 16 and 60, and conducted widespread deforestation campaigns, burning tracts of forest to flush out resisters.

Notes

References

Literature
Dallas, Gregor., 1945: The War That Never Ended, Yale University Press, Yale, 2006 
 
 Richard P. Wade:  "The Survivors of the Kurland Pocket 1944-1945". American Military University, Charlestown, West Virginia, 2015.

Military history of Latvia during World War II
Military operations of World War II involving Germany
Battles and operations of the Soviet–German War
Encirclements in World War II
1944 in Latvia
1945 in Latvia
Trench warfare
Battles in Latvia
Battles involving Latvia
Latvian Soviet Socialist Republic
Generalbezirk Lettland